Aube is a department in the northeastern part of France.

Aube may also refer to:

Places
 Aube, Moselle, a French municipality in the Moselle department
 Aube, Orne, a French municipality in the Orne department
 Aube (river), a river in France

People
 Aubé, a surname
 Aube (musician), a Japanese musician
 Théophile Aube (1826–1890), French admiral

Other uses

 , a Gloire-class armoured crusier

See also

 Aubé (disambiguation)
 
 Aub (disambiguation)